Mona Jarrahi (Persian: مونا جراحی; Jan 1979) is an Iranian Engineering professor at the University of California, Los Angeles. She investigates novel materials, terahertz/millimeter-wave electronics and optoelectronics, microwave photonics, imaging and spectroscopy systems.

Jarrahi was honored with the Presidential Early Career Award for Scientists and Engineers (PECASE) in 2013 for her work on Terahertz Optoelectronics.

Early life and career 

 
Jarrahi was born in Tehran and received her high school education in Iran. In 1995 she got a silver medal at the Iranian National Physics Olympiad. She got her B.S. degree in Electrical Engineering from Sharif University of Technology in 2000. She then joined Stanford University in 2001 as a graduate student where she got her MS and Ph.D. in Electrical Engineering in 2003 and 2007, respectively.  In 2016 she received the "Sharif University of Technology Distinguished Alumni Award".

She served as a Postdoctoral Scholar at the University of California, Berkeley from 2007 to 2008. After earning her Ph.D, Jarrahi joined University of Michigan Ann Arbor as an assistant professor (2008-2013). Afterward, she joined UCLA as an associate professor (2013-2017) and from 2017 she became a professor at UCLA in the Electrical and Computer Engineering Department.

Prof. Jarrahi has made contributions to the development of ultrafast electronic/optoelectronic devices and integrated systems for terahertz/millimeter-wave sensing, imaging, computing, and communication systems by utilizing novel materials, nanostructures, and quantum well structures as well as innovative plasmonic and optical concepts. The use of advanced terahertz imaging systems for early-stage detection of cancerous tumors is a subject she has been working on it.

Jarrahi is a Fellow Member of the Institute of Electrical and Electronics Engineers (IEEE), an Honorary Member of the IEEE Eta Kappa Nu (HKN), and Fellow Member of the Optical Society of America (OSA), a Fellow Member of the International Society of Optical Engineers (SPIE) and a Member of the American Physical Society (APS).

Awards and recognition 

On 23 December 2013, Jarrahi was honored with the Presidential Early Career Award for Scientists and Engineers (PECASE) award from the President of the United States, Barack Obama. She was one of 102 scientists and engineers to receive this award in 2013. The presidential award committee cited her work in Terahertz Optoelectronics.

Among the many awards and recognition Prof. Jarrahi received are in this table

References

Iranian electrical engineers
Sharif University of Technology alumni
University of California, Los Angeles alumni
Living people
1979 births
Fellows of Optica (society)
Fellows of the American Physical Society
University of Michigan faculty
SPIE
Iranian women engineers
Women in optics